Ashton-under-Lyne is a tram stop serving Ashton-under-Lyne on Greater Manchester's light rail Metrolink system, it is the terminus of the system's East Manchester Line (EML).  It is located beside Ashton-under-Lyne bus station, and a few minutes walk away from Ashton-under-Lyne railway station, forming an Ashton travel hub.

History
The stop was built as part of Phase 3b of the network's expansion, and opened on 9 October 2013, ahead of the originally-publicised schedule of the winter of 2013–14.

In May 2009, a special fund of £1.5 billion was agreed for 15 transport schemes in Greater Manchester. These included a further 2.1-mile (3.4 km) extension to the East Manchester line from Droylsden to Ashton-under-Lyne. Plans for the extension from Droylsden to Ashton-under-Lyne were fully approved by the Department for Transport in March 2010 whereupon MPact-Thales was appointed as the main contractor.

Services

Services are mostly every 12 minutes on all routes.

References

External links

Metrolink stop information
Ashton-under-Lyne area map
 Light Rail Transit Association

Tram stops in Tameside
Ashton-under-Lyne